Lau Ka-ho (born 22 July 1953) is a Hong Kong producer. In March 2012 he left TVB to sign for Now TV.

Filmography

TVB series

References

TVB producers
Living people
1953 births
Hong Kong people